Bisten is a village in the municipality of Überherrn in Saarland, Germany. It was an independent municipality until January 1974, when it was merged with Überherrn. It is situated on the river Bist, close to the border with France.

References

Former municipalities in Saarland